The 1942 season was the 13th completed season of Finnish Football League Championship but was played as cup competition.

Overview

The 1942 Mestaruussarja  could not be played and a cup competition was held instead. Not even a cup competition was arranged in 1943.

Semi-finals

Championship final

Footnotes

References

Mestaruussarja seasons
Fin
Fin
Mestaruussarja